Absolute Dominion is an upcoming American science fiction action film written, produced, and directed by Lexi Alexander. It stars Désiré Mia, Fabiano Viett, Alex Winter, Patton Oswalt, Julie Ann Emery, Andy Allo, and Alok Vaid-Menon.

Plot 
In 2085 A.D., the world has been destroyed by religious warfare. Desperate to save humanity, global governing forces host a gripping, no-holds-barred, martial arts tournament. Last fighter standing wins Absolute Dominion for one faith.

Cast 
 Désiré Mia
 Fabiano Viett
 Alex Winter
 Patton Oswalt
 Julie Ann Emery 
 Andy Allo
 Alok Vaid-Menon

Production 
In April 2022, Netflix and Blumhouse Television announced Absolute Dominion which was written and directed by Lexi Alexander with Alex Winter, Andy Allo, Alok Vaid-Menon, Désiré Mia, Fabiano Viett, and Patton Oswalt starring.

Filming
Principal photography on the film began in April 2022 in Nevada.

Release
Absolute Dominion was set to be released by Blumhouse Productions and Netflix, before the film was dropped by both studios.

References

External links 
 

Upcoming films
Upcoming English-language films
American science fiction action films
Films directed by Lexi Alexander
Films shot in Nevada
2020s American films